Loricaria lentiginosa is a species of catfish of the family Loricariidae. It is endemic to the upper Paraná River basin in Brazil. It reaches 51.4 cm (20.2 inches) in standard length and is believed to be a facultative air-breather. The species was described by Dutch ichthyologist Isaäc J. H. Isbrücker in 1979.

References

External links
 

Fish described in 1979
Loricariini
Taxa named by Isaäc J. H. Isbrücker